Charles "Doc" Whelan (April 3, 1877 – May 29, 1945) was an American football player and coach and physician. He served as the head football coach at Tufts College—now Tufts University—for three stints (1903–1907, 1912–1917, and 1919) and at Boston University from 1921 to 1925, compiling a career college football record of 54–68–7. Whelan also coached track at Harvard University. He died after a brief illness in 1945.

Early life
Whelan was born on April 3, 1877 in Weymouth, Massachusetts. He graduated from Weymouth High School in 1896 and entered Dartmouth College that fall. He left after one year to work in Boston, but returned a year later and graduated in 1901. While at Dartmouth, Whelan played fullback on the school's football team and specialized in the broadjump and the shotput on the track team.

Coaching career
Whelan worked his way through the Tufts School of Medicine by serving as coach of the school's football team and as the athletic director at the Volkmann School. After graduating, Whelan left athletics to work as a physician, but returned to football in 1910 as an assistant coach at Dartmouth. He returned to Tufts in 1912 and remained with the school until 1920 when he became supervisor of the Harvard Crimson track team and a professor of hygiene at Harvard College (he missed the 1918 season due to military service). His tenure at Harvard was short-lived as he submitted his resignation less than three months after taking the job to return to medicine. His final coaching position was at Boston University, where he served as head football coach from 1921 to 1925.

Medical career
Whelan was a pioneer in radiology. He was the chief radiologist at Quincy City Hospital and was the head of the x-ray at the New York Port of Embarkation Hospital during World War I. He was also a consultant Carney Hospital and New England Hospital for Women and Children.

Head coaching record

References

1877 births
1945 deaths
American football fullbacks
American radiologists
Boston University Terriers football coaches
Dartmouth Big Green football coaches
Dartmouth Big Green football players
Dartmouth Big Green men's track and field athletes
Harvard Crimson track and field coaches
Tufts Jumbos football coaches
Harvard University faculty
United States Army Medical Corps officers
United States Army personnel of World War I
People from Cohasset, Massachusetts
Sportspeople from Weymouth, Massachusetts
Coaches of American football from Massachusetts
Players of American football from Massachusetts
Track and field athletes from Massachusetts
Military personnel from Massachusetts